A Happy Coercion is a 1914 American silent short comedy film based on a story by Theodosia Harris. The film stars Perry Banks, William Bertram, Jacques Jaccard, Louise Lester, Jack Richardson, Vivian Rich, and Harry Van Meter.

External links

1914 films
1914 comedy films
Silent American comedy films
American silent short films
American black-and-white films
1914 short films
American comedy short films
1910s American films
1910s English-language films